Mk Ultra was an American alternative band that played between 1994 and 1999.  The group formed in the Bay Area in the early nineties and went on to become a hit in local circles.  Mk Ultra's career culminated in a national tour in 1999 but came to a rapid end when guitarist John Tyner decided to leave. The other members, already working on side projects, did not wish to find a replacement.

Much of Mk Ultra's style has been carried on by John Vanderslice and his new band.

Members
 Dan Carr on bass and backup vocals, now a member of Creeper Lagoon
 Matt Torrey on drums, backup vocals and piano, became a member of Jets to Brazil
 John Tyner, guitar and backup vocals
 John Vanderslice, lead vocals, guitar, and sampling, now a solo artist

Discography
Mk Ultra (1994)
Original Motion Picture Soundtrack (1996)
The Dream Is Over  (1999)

References

Alternative rock groups from California